William Bourdon (born 1956) is a French lawyer of the Paris Bar Association who practices criminal law, particularly specializing in white-collar crime, communications law and human rights. He particularly specializes in defending the victims of globalization and crimes against humanity. He has been with Bourdon Simoni Voituriez since 1979. He is widely considered one of the most powerful international lawyers

Family and education 
William Bourdon is the son of engineer and manufacturer Philippe Bourdon, the grandson of Pierre Bourdon, former Michelin chief engineer, and the great-grandson of manufacturer Édouard Michelin, founder of groupe Michelin.

He studied at Lycée Janson-de-Sailly, then at the Université Paris 1 Panthéon-Sorbonne. He holds a master's degree in (Private law) and is a graduate of Sciences Po

Professional and sociopolitical activities 
Bourdon was Under Secretary-General (1994–1995), then Secretary-General of the Fédération internationale des droits de l'homme from 1995 to 2000. In October 2001, he founded Sherpa, whose goal is to "defend the victims of crimes committed by economic operators." He is also currently the organization's president.

Bourdon was also the lawyer for Transparency International, Survie and the Fédération des Congolais de la Diaspora (FCD). He is close to associations who provide help to foreign nationals without proper papers, such as Cimade, for whom he acted as an observer in 1992.

Bourdon distinguished himself in criminal law in the 1980s, for example with the defence of prostitutes in the Jobic affair, a police commissioner accused of procuring before finally being released.

He then specialized in human rights (SOS Racisme, Chinese opponents, genocide in Rwanda, Augusto Pinochet; protesters, partisans of social struggle or far left militants.

In 2006, he defended Sud-PTT trade unionist Cyril Ferez who, he said, "took a real beating from 15 or so CRS officers (riot police) for quite a while" during a demonstration against a controversial law concerning work and education. He also defended Yildune Lévy, a close friend of Julien Coupat in the sabotage of SNCF overhead power lines, two French detainees held at Guantánamo sentenced by French justice, or the People's Mujahedin of Iran.

In 2009, Boudon defended André Barthélemy, president of "Agir Ensemble pour les Droits de l'Homme" before the criminal court of Bobigny for "direct incitement of rebellion" and "deliberately impeding the movement of an aircraft", for having opposed the manner in which two Congolese nationals were escorted back to the border.

He defended police commandant Philippe Pichon, accused of leaking the  files of two stars, D. Debbouze et Johnny Hallyday, to publicize and denounce the system's flaws. Its error rate was said to exceed 40%.

In Senegal in 2000, Bourdon filed a criminal complaint and charges of torture and crimes against humanity against Hissène Habré in the name of the FIDH. In December 2008, after the failure of complaints against Omar Bongo, Denis Sassou Nguesso, and Teodoro Obiang Nguema Mbasogo, Sherpa and Transparency international filed a complaint against person or persons unknown on the conditions under which a lot of movable and fixed assets were acquired in France by these African heads of state.
In 2005 he defended, Motassim Bilal " Hannibal " Kadhafi, son of Colonel Mouammar Kadhafi, sentenced 23 May 2005 by the 10th Chamber of the Tribunal correctionnel de Paris to four months imprisonment, suspended,  for domestic violence.

On 25 October 2007, he filed a defamation complaint "avec constitution de partie civile" against Jeune Afrique and its editor-in-chief, François Soudan, on behalf of Moussa Koussa, head of the Libyan foreign intelligence service. The complaint was voluntarily withdrawn 10 April 2009.

Considering that "originally absolute, the immunity of heads of state has, since the end of the Second World War, had limits," Bourdon declared in an interview with Libération that the arrêt might create "confusion", since only three crimes have universally justified lifting presidential immunity: genocide, crimes against humanity and war crimes: "Terrorism is a very subjective crime. If one reasons in this manner, Yasser Arafat could be pursued," observed Maître Bourdon, underlining that terrorism and narcotics trafficking were deliberately omitted when the International Criminal Court (ICC) was created. In keeping with this point, the parquet général asked the Court of Cassation to pronounce for the first time on the controversial question of the immunity of heads of state. This motion does not require suspending the current investigation.

In March 2007, Bourdon appealed to voters to vote for presidential election candidate Ségolène Royal in a petition published by the Nouvel Observateur.

In April 2009, he participated in a campaign meeting for the European elections of the Europe Écologie movement coalition (led by Daniel Cohn-Bendit) along with Eva Joly. He proclaimed: "I want to be free of everybody. I do not want to be part of any system."

In 2012, Bourdon again grew closer to the Socialist Party and was part of François Hollande's campaign team.

In 2014, he briefly joined the "Nouvelle Donne" party.

In 2017, Bourdon was among the co-founders of The Platform to Protect Whistleblowers in Africa (PPLAAF), an organization whose aim is to defend whistleblowers, as well as strategically litigate and advocate on their behalf where their disclosures speak to the public interest of African citizens.

Other biography 
 2000—wrote and self-published the essay La Cour pénale internationale – Le Statut de Rome (The International Criminal Court – The Statute of Rome), in which he explains and critiques, article by article, the fine points of this authority, adopted 17 July 1998 and in effect since 1 July 2002.
 2001—created Sherpa, an organization which works to materialize the notion of corporate social responsibility through improving the available judicial tools.
 2005—had petroleum group TotalEnergies pay €5.2 million to Burmese victims at the close of pre-trial mediation proceedings.
 2006—appeared as himself, a lawyer for the African parties civiles (civil parties) in the film Bamako by Abderrahmane Sissako, in which he presents oral arguments against the World Bank and the International Monetary Fund (IMF) at the film's conclusion. Since December 2006 he has also been co-president of the Société des lecteurs de Libération (SLL) with Zina Rouabah.
 2014—published the "Little book of civil disobedience" through JCLattès. Discusses the fate of whistle-blowers and the non-compliant and the risks that they face.
 initiated first French proceedings undertaken against individuals responsible for crimes against humanity, notably in Rwanda and Serbia. He also represents the Chilean-French victims of dictator Augusto Pinochet.
 member, International Committee to Support Vietnamese victims of Agent Orange and of the New York Process (CIS).

Filmography as himself 
 2006 : Bamako by Abderrahmane Sissako (Prix Lumière du meilleur film francophone 2007)

Bibliography 
 Petit manuel de désobéissance citoyenne , JC Lattès, 2014.
 La Cour pénale internationale – Le Statut de Rome, avec Emmanuelle Duverger, Le Seuil, 2000.
 Face aux crimes du marché. Quels armes juridiques pour les citoyens ? Suivi de 39 propositions, La Découverte, 2010.

References

External links 
 Sherpa website
 Official website of the Fédération internationale des droits de l'homme
 William Bourdon's blog
 Personal website of William Bourdon
 Website of Bourdon & Forestier

1956 births
Living people
Sciences Po alumni
Pantheon-Sorbonne University alumni
Lycée Janson-de-Sailly alumni
20th-century French lawyers
People from Neuilly-sur-Seine
21st-century French lawyers